Home video is recorded media sold or rented for home viewing. The term originates from the VHS and Betamax era, when the predominant medium was videotapes, but has carried over to optical disc formats such as DVD, Blu-ray and streaming media. In a different usage, "home video" refers to amateur video recordings, also known as home movies.

The home-video business distributes films,  television series, telefilms and other audiovisual media in the form of videos in various formats to the public. These are either bought or rented, and then watched privately in purchasers' homes. Most theatrically released films are now released on digital media, both optical and download-based, replacing the largely obsolete videotape medium.  the Video CD format remained popular in Asia. DVDs are gradually losing popularity since the late 2010s and early 2020s, when streaming media became mainstream among its audiences, since most of them have Internet access.

History
As early as 1906, various film entrepreneurs began to discuss the potential of home viewing of films, and in 1912, both Edison and Pathé started selling film projectors for home use.  Because making release prints was (and still is) very expensive, early home projector owners rented films by mail from the projector manufacturer.  Edison's business model was fundamentally flawed because the company had started with phonographs and did not understand that home viewing is fundamentally different from home listening.  Edison ended its home viewing business in 1914, while Pathé remained somewhat longer, but exited at some point during World War I.

After the quick failures of these early attempts at home viewing, most feature films were essentially inaccessible to the public after their original theatrical runs. For most of the 20th century, the idea that ordinary consumers could own copies of films and watch them at their convenience in their own homes "was beyond the grasp of reasonable expectations."  Some very popular films were given occasional theatrical re-releases in urban revival houses and the screening rooms of a few archives and museums. Beginning in the 1950s, most could be expected to be broadcast on television, eventually. During this era, television programs normally could only be viewed at the time of broadcast. Viewers were accustomed to the fact that there was no easy way to record television shows at home and watch them whenever desired.

In 1924, Kodak invented 16 mm film, which became popular for home use, and then later developed 8 mm film.  After that point, the public could purchase a film projector for one of those film formats and rent or buy home-use prints of some cartoons, short comedies, and brief "highlights" reels edited from feature films. In the case of the 16 mm format, most of these were available with an optical soundtrack. Some entire feature films in 16-mm could be rented or bought. The 8 mm films almost never ran longer than 10 minutes; only a few were available with a magnetic soundtrack late in the life of the format. The Super 8 film format, introduced in 1965, was marketed for making home movies, but it also boosted the popularity of show-at-home films. Eventually, longer, edited-down versions of feature films were issued, which increasingly came in color and with a magnetic soundtrack, but in comparison to modern technologies, film projection was still quite expensive and difficult to use.  As a result, home viewing of films remained limited to a small community of dedicated hobbyists willing and able to invest large amounts of money in projectors, screens, and film prints, and it therefore made little revenue for film companies.

In 1956, Ampex pioneered the first commercially practical videotape recording system.  The Ampex system, though, used reel-to-reel tape and physically bulky equipment not suitable for home use.

In the mid-1970s, videotape became the first truly practical home-video format with the development of videocassettes, which were far easier to use than tape reels. The Betamax and VHS home videocassette formats were introduced, respectively, in 1975 and 1976 but several more years and significant reductions in the prices of both equipment and videocassettes were needed before both formats started to become widespread in households.

The first company to duplicate and distribute feature films from major film studios on home video was Magnetic Video.  Magnetic Video was established in 1968 as an audio and video duplication service for professional audio and television corporations in Farmington Hills, Michigan.  After Betamax was launched in the United States in 1976, Magnetic Video chief executive Andre Blay wrote letters to all the major film studios offering to license the rights to their films.  Near the end of 1977, Magnetic Video entered into a first-of-its-kind deal with 20th Century Fox.  Magnetic Video agreed to pay Fox a royalty of $7.50 per unit sold and a guaranteed annual minimum payment of $500,000 in exchange for nonexclusive rights to 50 films, which had to be at least two years old and had already been broadcast on network television. 

Home video was born, initially, as a rental business.   Film studios and video distributors assumed that the overwhelming majority of consumers would not want to buy prerecorded videocassettes, but would merely rent them.  They felt that virtually all sales of videocassettes would be to video rental stores and set prices accordingly. According to Douglas Gomery, studio executives thought that the handful of consumers actually interested in purchasing videocassettes in order to watch them again and again would be similar to the small community of film buffs who for decades had willingly paid hundreds of dollars to purchase release prints.  Therefore, in 1977, Magnetic Video originally priced its videocassettes at $50 to $70 each—a princely sum at a time when the average price of an American movie ticket was $2.23—and sold them only to wholesalers capable of handling a minimum order of $8,000.  When the rental market took off like a rocket, Fox bought Magnetic Video in 1978 and turned the company into its home video division. 

During the 1980s, video rental stores became a popular way to watch home video.  Video rental stores are physical retail businesses that rent home videos such as movies, prerecorded TV shows, as well as sometimes selling other media, such as physical video game copies on disc. Typically, a rental shop conducts business with customers under conditions and terms agreed upon in a rental agreement or contract, which may be implied, explicit, or written. Many video rental stores also sell previously viewed movies and/or new unopened movies. In the 1980s, video rental stores rented films in both the VHS and Betamax formats, although most stores stopped using Betamax tapes when VHS won the format war late in the decade.  The shift to home viewing radically changed revenue streams for film companies, because home renting provided an additional window of time in which a film could make money. In some cases, films that performed only modestly in their theater releases went on to sell significantly well in the rental market (e.g., cult films).

During the 1980s, video distributors gradually realized that many consumers did want to build their own video libraries, and not just rent, if the price was right.  Rather than sell a few thousand units at a wholesale price of $70 into the rental channel, video distributors could sell hundreds of thousands of units at a wholesale price of $15-20 into the retail "sell-through" channel.

The "ultimate accelerant" for the rise of the "sell-through" home video market was the development of children's home video. The pre-1980s conventional wisdom that consumers had no interest in watching the same films again and again at home turned out to be entirely wrong with respect to children.  Many harried parents discovered that it was a good investment to pay $20 to purchase a videocassette that could reliably keep their children riveted to the television screen for over an hour—and not just one time, but many, many times.  The Walt Disney Company recognized that its flagship animation studio's family-friendly films were superbly positioned to conquer the home video market, and through its home video division, Buena Vista Home Entertainment, the company did just that during the 1980s and 1990s. This spectacular success "catapulted the head of Disney's video division, Bill Mechanic, into executive stardom."  In 1994, Mechanic left Disney to become head of Fox Filmed Entertainment.  Another executive, Bob Chapek, would later ascend through the ranks of Disney's home video division to become chief executive officer of the entire company in 2020, and for that reason has been called "the home entertainment industry’s single biggest success story."

Special-interest video production
Until the mid-1980s, home video was dominated by feature film theatrical releases such as The Wizard of Oz, Citizen Kane, and Casablanca from major film studios. At that time, not many people owned a VCR, and those who did tended to rent rather than buy videos. Toward the end of that decade, a rise of smaller companies began producing special-interest videos, also known as "nontheatrical programming" and "alternative programming", and "selling-through" to the customer. It was pointed out at the time that:

Special-interest video increased the number of topics and audiences to include "...dog handling videos, back pain videos and cooking videos", which were not previously thought of as marketable. Next, even "golf and skiing tapes* started selling. Contemporary sources noted, "new technology has changed the territory" of the home video market.

Decline of videotape and popularization of disks

In the early 2000s, VHS gradually began to be displaced by DVD. The DVD format has several advantages over VHS. A DVD consists of a single disc, which is spun at high speed, while VHS videocassettes had several moving parts that were far more vulnerable to breaking down under heavy wear and tear.  Each time a VHS cassette was played, the magnetic tape inside had to be pulled out and wrapped around the inclined drum head inside the player.  While a VHS tape can be erased if it is exposed to a rapidly changing magnetic field of sufficient strength, DVDs and other optical discs are not affected by magnetic fields. The relative mechanical simplicity and durability of DVD compared to the fragility of VHS made DVDs a far better format from a rental store's perspective.

Though DVDs do not have the problems of videocassettes, such as breakage of the tape or the cassette mechanism, they can still be damaged by scratches. Another advantage from the perspective of video rental stores is that DVDs are physically much smaller, so they take less space to store.  DVDs also offer a number of advantages for the viewer: DVDs can support both standard 4:3 and widescreen 16:9 screen-aspect ratios, and can provide twice the video resolution of VHS. Skipping ahead to the end is much easier and faster with a DVD than with a VHS tape (which has to be rewound).  DVDs can have interactive menus, multiple language tracks, audio commentaries, closed captioning, and subtitling (with the option of turning the subtitles on or off, or selecting subtitles in several languages). Moreover, a DVD can be played on a computer.

Due to all these advantages, by the mid 2000s, DVDs had become the dominant form of prerecorded video movies in both the rental film and new movie markets.  In the late 2000s, stores began selling Blu-ray discs, a format that supports high definition.

Blu-ray is a digital optical disc data storage format, designed to supersede the DVD format, and is capable of storing several hours of video in high definition (HDTV 720p and 1080p). The main application of Blu-ray is as a medium for video material such as feature films and for the physical distribution of video games. The plastic disc is the same size as DVDs and compact discs.

Blu-ray was officially released on June 20, 2006, beginning the high-definition optical disc format war, in which Blu-ray Disc competed against the HD DVD format. Toshiba, the main company supporting HD DVD, conceded in February 2008. Blu-ray has competition from video on demand (VOD) and the continued sale of DVDs. As of January 2016, 44% of U.S. broadband households had a Blu-ray player.

In the late 1990s and early 2000s, though, people continued to use VCRs to record over-the-air TV shows, because they could not make home recordings onto DVDs. This problem with DVD was resolved in the late 2000s, when inexpensive DVD recorders and other digital video recorders (DVRs)which record shows onto a hard disk or flash storagebecame available to purchase and rent.

Despite the mainstream dominance of DVD, VHS continued to be used, albeit less frequently, throughout the 2000s; decline in VHS use continued during the 2010s. The switch to DVD initially led to mass-selling of used VHS videocassettes, which were available at used-goods stores, typically for a much lower price than the equivalent film on a used DVD.  In July 2016, the last known manufacturer of VCRs, Funai, announced that it was ceasing VCR production.

Transition from disk-based viewing to a streaming culture
One of movie streaming's largest impacts was on DVD, which has become less popular with the mass popularization of online streaming of media. Media streaming's popularization caused many DVD rental companies, such as Blockbuster, to go out of business. In July 2015, The New York Times published an article about Netflix's DVD-by-mail services. It stated that Netflix was continuing their DVD services with 5.3 million subscribers, which was a significant decrease from the previous year, but their streaming services had 65 million members.

Netflix's primary business is its subscription-based streaming service, which offers online streaming of a library of films and television programs, including those produced in-house. As of April 2019, Netflix had over 148 million paid subscriptions worldwide, including 60 million in the United States, and over 154 million subscriptions total, including free trials. It is available worldwide except in mainland China (due to local restrictions), Syria, North Korea, and Crimea (due to U.S. sanctions). The company also has offices in India, the Netherlands, Brazil, Japan, and South Korea. Netflix is a member of the Motion Picture Association. Netflix began producing media itself in 2012. Since 2012, Netflix has taken more of an active role as producer and distributor for both film and television series.

Time gap between theatrical and home video release

A time period is usually required to elapse between theatrical release and availability on home video to encourage movie theater patronage and discourage copyright infringement. Home-video releases originally followed five to six months after theatrical release, but since the late 2000s, most films have begun being distributed on video after three to four months. As of 2019, most major theater chains mandate an exclusivity window of 90 days before home-video release, and 74–76 days before electronic sell-through. Christmas and other holiday-related movies are sometimes not released on home video until the following year, when the holiday occurs again. Major studios have made films available for rental during their theatrical window on high-end services that charge upwards of $500 per rental and use proprietary hardware.

Exceptions to the rule include the Steven Soderbergh film Bubble, which was released in 2006 to theaters, cable television, and DVD only a few days apart. Netflix has released some of its films, such as Roma and The Irishman, in limited theatrical release followed by streaming availability after less than 30 days.

Television programs
Many television programs are now also available in complete seasons on DVD. It has become popular practice for discontinued TV shows to be released to DVD one season at a time every few months and active shows to be released on DVD after the end of each season. Prior to the television DVDs, most television shows were only viewable in syndication,  on limited "best of" VHS releases of selected episodes or released slowly in volumes with only two or three episodes per tape. These copyrighted movies and programs generally have legal restrictions on them preventing them from, among other things, being shown in public venues, shown to other people for money, or copied for other than fair use purposes (although such ability is limited by some jurisdictions and media formatssee below).

Pre-Certs
After the passage of the Video Recordings (Labelling) Act of 1985 in the United Kingdom, videotapes and other video recordings without a certification symbol from the British Board of Film Classification  on their coversor on the tapes themselveswere no longer allowed to be sold or displayed by rental shops. These tapes are called "Pre-Certs" (e.g., Pre-certification tapes). Recently these tapes have generated a cult following, due to their collectability.

DVD Awards
Every year since 2004, the film festival Il Cinema Ritrovato holds the DVD Awards, where they award the highest quality DVDs (and later Blu-rays) released by home-media companies around the world.

See also
Copyright
Direct-to-video
Film distribution
Home cinema
Laserdisc
Videocassette recorder
DVD
Blu-ray
Capacitance Electronic Disc
Streaming media

Categories and lists
List of best-selling films in the United States
List of notable home video companies
:Category:Home video companies of the United States
:Category:Video

References